Massachusetts House of Representatives' 1st Bristol district in the United States is one of 160 legislative districts included in the lower house of the Massachusetts General Court. It covers parts of Bristol County and Norfolk County. Republican F. Jay Barrows of Mansfield has represented the district since 2009. Candidates running for this district seat in the 2020 Massachusetts general election include Brendan Roche.

Towns represented
The district includes the following localities:
 Foxborough
 Mansfield
 Norton

The current district geographic boundary overlaps with that of the Massachusetts Senate's Bristol and Norfolk district.

Former locales
The district previously covered:
 Attleboro, circa 1872, 1927 
 North Attleborough, circa 1927

Representatives
 William W. Blodgett, circa 1858-1859 
 Horatio N. Richardson, circa 1858 
 William D. Earl, circa 1859 
 George R. Perry, circa 1888 
 Abijah T. Wales, circa 1888 
 Frank Coombs, circa 1908
 Samuel Holman, circa 1908
 William Bartlett, circa 1918
 William Plattner, circa 1920 
 George M. Worrall, circa 1920 
 Charles Sumner Holden, circa 1923
 Harry Kent, circa 1923
 Francis Kelley, circa 1935
 Fred Briggs, circa 1935
 Arthur Eaton Young, circa 1951 
 Carlton Bliss, circa 1953
 George Spatcher, circa 1967
 Donald R. Gaudette, circa 1975 
 Roger R. Goyette, 1977-1978 
 William B. Vernon, circa 1991
 Barbara Hyland, 1992–2001
 Michael J. Coppola, 2001–2005
 Ginny Coppola, 2006–2007
 Fred Jay Barrows, 2009-current

See also
 List of Massachusetts House of Representatives elections
 Other Bristol County districts of the Massachusetts House of Representatives: 2nd, 3rd, 4th, 5th, 6th, 7th, 8th, 9th, 10th, 11th, 12th, 13th, 14th
 List of Massachusetts General Courts
 List of former districts of the Massachusetts House of Representatives

Images

References

External links

 Ballotpedia
  (State House district information based on U.S. Census Bureau's American Community Survey).

House
Government of Bristol County, Massachusetts
Government of Norfolk County, Massachusetts